Manolis Vasyliovych Pilavov (born 24 March 1964) is a politician and sporting administrator from Luhansk. Rebel-appointed Mayor since 2014. He is also the President of the Luhansk Football Federation, and in 2009 briefly served as the President of football club Zorya Luhansk. Prior to working in the field of sports administration, Pilavov was a civil engineer.

Pilavov was a member of the pro-Russian Party of Regions, which was the ruling party in Ukraine until it was overthrown in 2014. He opposed the revolution, and later supported the creation of the Luhansk People's Republic as an independent state. He was subsequently investigated by the Security Service of Ukraine, which declared him to be an active participant of an illegal armed group.

Biography 
Manolis Pivalov was born in the Georgian SSR on 24 March 1964 to ethnically mixed family with Russian, Ossetian, Greek, Georgian and Armenian roots. He moved to Luhansk at a young age.

In 1981, he graduated from the Voroshilovgrad Construction College. Afterwards, he graduated from the Luhansk Agricultural Institute with a degree in agricultural construction.

In July 1986, he became a painter of the construction department No. 4 of the Voroshilovgradpromstroy trust, and in December became a foreman of the construction department No. 2 of the Voroshilovgradpromstroy trust. In December 1989, he became the head of the production and technological machine and equipment department of the Voroshilovgradpromstroy trust. Since October 1990, he was the head of the housing maintenance association of the Leninsky district and later the Zhovtnevy district. In 1998, he became the first deputy head of the housing department of the Luhansk city executive committee and the first deputy chairman of the council for the activities of the executive bodies of the Kamennobrodsky district council.

In 2001 he graduated from the Eastern Ukrainian National University with a degree in public service.

In April 2002, he became deputy mayor of Luhansk for the activities of executive bodies.

In June 2002, he became the general director of the regional communal enterprise "Luganskvoda". In February 2004, he became deputy chairman of the Kamennobrodsky district council. In April 2006, he became the first deputy of the Luhansk mayor. In 2009, he took over as president of the Luhansk Football Federation.

In 2014, amidst conflict and war, he was an active in maintaining Luhansk's economy, participated in the activities of the Luhansk People's Republic, and after Sergei Kravchenko was detained in August 2014, he took over the leadership of the city. On December 2, 2014, by the decree of the Head of the Luhansk People's Republic Igor Plotnitsky, he became rebel-appointed Mayor. He was subsequently charged by the Ukrainian authorities under Article 258 of Ukraine's Criminal Code, which deals with support for armed groups.

References

Links 

 Дані на сторінці footballfan.com.ua (рос.)

Party of Regions politicians
People from Kvemo Kartli
People of the Luhansk People's Republic
East Ukrainian Volodymyr Dahl National University alumni
Ukrainian collaborators with Russia
Mayors of places in Ukraine
1964 births
Living people